David Howie (born c. 1927) is a Scottish curler.

He played lead on Chuck Hay's team out of the Kilgraston & Moncrieffe Curling Club in Perth, Scotland during a very successful run in the 1960s. The team won the Scottish Men's Championship four years in a row, earning them the right to represent Scotland at the World Curling Championships in those years. At World's in 1966 and 1968 Glen's team took home the silver medal, with Canada winning the Championship each of those years. At the 1967 World Men's Championship they defeated Team Sweden, skipped by Bob Woods, in the final to win Scotland's first World Men's Championship.

Howie worked as a farmer in Perthshire.

Teams

References

External links
 

1920s births
Living people
Scottish male curlers
World curling champions
Scottish curling champions
Scottish farmers
People from Perthshire